Monte da Pedra is a Portuguese freguesia ("parish") in the municipality of Crato, Portugal.

The name of the village means "stone hill".

Villages in Portugal
Freguesias of Crato, Portugal